Georgina Gharsallah (born 29 October 1987) is an English woman who went missing after leaving her mother's house in Worthing, West Sussex, on 7 March 2018.

Background 
Georgina Gharsallah was born in Brighton, Sussex in 1987. Her parents were Andrea and Gassem Gharsallah. Gassem was a Libyan who attended university in Brighton where he met Andrea who was English. The couple had four daughters of whom Georgina ('Gina') was the second eldest. Shortly after Georgina was born the family relocated to Libya where they lived until 1998. Gharsallah spoke Arabic. After returning to the UK the family settled in Worthing where Andrea found employment in a local convent caring for elderly nuns. She became estranged from her husband and the couple divorced. By 2018 Gassem was managing director of a small food company based in Worthing. He later remarried. The four daughters including Georgina remained with their mother.

Gharsallah was considered intelligent and articulate, she developed an itinerant lifestyle as an adult. She drank alcohol and smoked cannabis. Although, most adults in the UK has done this in their lifetime, the police still considered this a red flag. It was reported that she suffered from mental health issues. Which, again, a large section of the UK population suffers from too at least once in their lifetime. She was considered "unreliable" by some people who knew her. At the time of her disappearance she was looking for employment and was recently estranged from a partner. She had two children. Gharsallah had moved back in with her mother although she was still meeting her most recent former partner regularly, as they were co-parenting two children. She would sometimes stay with friends in her native Brighton.

Disappearance

Last known movements 
Gharsallah left her mother's house on Wednesday 7 March 2018 at around 9:30am. She told her mother that she was having problems with her mobile phone and that she would visit a phone store to seek advice. She also stated that she would visit the Jobcentre Plus in Worthing town centre and would meet her father later in the morning. She asked for and received a small loan from her mother to repair the phone. She was recorded on CCTV at around 9:50am entering the nearby Clifton Food and Wine shop in Clifton Road, Worthing. The shop manager would later state that Gharsallah had asked him for help with her phone and that he had directed her to a speciality phone store. Gharsallah left the shop and that was the last certain sighting of her. She did not visit the local Jobcentre and did not keep her appointment with her father. There is no record or recollection of her entering any of the phone stores in Worthing that day. Subsequent tracking of her mobile phone indicated its last use at 3am on the day and that it had left the network shortly after 11:30am while still connected to a local mast in Worthing. It never reconnected to the network. Gharsalla's bank accounts and bank cards were never used again.

Reported missing 
Andrea was not initially disturbed when Gharsallah did not return to her house later that day. She assumed that Gharsallah had either had gone to stay with friends or had returned to her ex-partner. It was only the following week that Andrea became alarmed. Gharsallah failed to make arrangements to host her two sons for the weekend as was normal. Her ex-partner telephoned to say that he had not heard from Gharsallah for some days and was concerned about her. Andrea spent several days attempting to contact her daughter without success. She finally contacted Sussex Police on Saturday 17 March 2018 to report Gharsallah as a missing person.

Investigation

Progress of the enquiry   
The Sussex Police investigation of Gharsallah's disappearance was significantly slow to get started. In recent years an average of around 350,000 people per year are reported missing in England and Wales. The large majority of these cases are quickly resolved when the missing person reappears or is traced. Police do not  prioritise cases where the missing person is not vulnerable and where there is no evidence of violence. The homes of Gharsallah's mother Andrea and ex-partners were searched and checks were initiated on her mobile phone and bank accounts. CCTV recordings from the immediate vicinity of Andrea's house were checked and this disclosed the recording of Gharsallah at a shop in Clifton Road. A public appeal for information was made. After three weeks the disappearance was considered suspicious and the investigation was upgraded. However, it made little progress. Various theories for Gharsallah's disappearance were considered including :

 That she had gone away voluntarily to escape problem issues in her life. This was plausible to an extent. But it didn't explain that none of her friends knew about her whereabouts or had heard from her at all after her disappearance. She was known to have associations in Brighton, London, and with a wider Arab circle.

 That she had committed suicide in a manner that did not allow her body to be found. This was somehow plausible given aspects of her personal history.

 That she had been abducted and murdered, although no evidence was pointing to this. A variation on this is that she suffered a misadventure and people she was with found it expedient to conceal her body rather than report the matter.

Gharsallah's family sought information via appeals over social media. Notably, Andrea set up a Facebook page and this attracted many reported sightings, offers of information and comments. Andrea passed much of this on to the police who did not find all of it to be credible. Potential witnesses would often withdraw or modify information when approached by detectives. Some of the reported sightings were determined to be cases of mistaken identity. Two men were briefly arrested as a result of such a report but were quickly released without charge. CCTV footage was obtained by police from many sites in Worthing and one item was judged relevant. At around 3:30pm on 7 March 2018 two women were recorded together in the town centre of Worthing and one of them resembled Gharsallah. The video footage was circulated by the police in August 2019 with a request for information. But the two women were never identified. Some observers questioned whether the woman in the afternoon video was actually Gharsallah. One obvious discrepancy is that Gharsallah was wearing black high heel boots in the morning video at Clifton Road but the woman in the town centre that afternoon was wearing tan coloured flat heeled boots. For the two to be the same person it would require that Gharsallah had changed her footwear during the day.

The case was featured on the BBC Crimewatch TV show in October 2018. The Crimestoppers charity offered a £5,000 reward for information leading to the conviction of Gharsallah's abductor. In August 2019 the police finally upgraded the investigation to that of a murder enquiry at which point the Crimestoppers reward was raised to £10,000.

Dissatisfaction with the police enquiry 
Gharsallah's family quickly became dissatisfied with the pace of the police investigation and started their own crowd-funded enquiry. In addition to a dedicated Facebook page an actress was engaged in order to film a reconstruction of Gharsallah's last known movements. Family members and volunteers searched sites around the Worthing area where they considered it possible that her body had been concealed. The family also brought in retired detectives to review the police enquiry. Information generated through social media was passed on to the police who were not always as responsive as the family wished. In particular, the police declined to arrest and question people without what they considered to be good reason. The police similarly declined to search sites without evidence that anything was concealed there. Most notably, the family requested that work on the Teville Gate development site in Worthing was stopped while a full search of the site was made. This the police refused to do.

In July 2020, Gharsallah's family asked for an independent review of police failings in the case. The family submitted a list of those claimed failings to Jo Shiner, the newly appointed Sussex Police chief constable. The substance of the failings was that the police enquiry had been slow to start, poorly resourced and lacking in commitment. Particular issues included a failure to collect CCTV evidence from town centre premises until a time at which much relevant footage was no longer available. Some of the footage collected was lost and it took over a year for the police to review the rest.

The seemingly low key police approach to Gharsallah's disappearance was contrasted with police enquiries into the similar cases of Claudia Lawrence and Madeleine McCann. In these two cases, extended enquiries were made which included arrests, interrogations and site excavations. Some observers suggested that race may have been a factor; Lawrence and McCann were both white, while Gharsallah was mixed race. It was also pointed out that the initial Crimestoppers reward for information on Gharsallah had been £5,000 while at a similar stage in the 2009 Lawrence enquiry the equivalent reward had been £10,000. The Sussex police denied any racial bias.

Aftermath 
The investigation was distinguished by a mutual lack of confidence between the Gharsallah family and the Sussex Police. The police did not welcome the family's parallel investigation. For example, a police spokesman was critical of the family's filmed reconstruction of Gharsallah's last movements. The reconstruction showed Gharsallah alive and well in Worthing town centre around 3:30pm on the day of her disappearance. However, CCTV footage of a person resembling her being there is unconfirmed and disputed. The spokesman stated that the reconstruction could therefore be misleading. He argued that there was good quality video of her at the Clifton Food and Wine store so there was little point in staging a reconstruction. The spokesman also argued that an economic and targeted use of police resources was critical, and that there was little point in undertaking searches, excavations and arrests unless prompted by credible evidence. Gharsallah's fate remains unknown.

See also
List of people who disappeared

References

1987 births
2010s missing person cases
History of West Sussex
Missing person cases in England
Possibly living people
Worthing
March 2018 events in the United Kingdom
2010s in West Sussex
2018 in England